George Arthur Walker (25 January 1919 – 31 August 1995) was an English cricketer. Walker was a right-handed batsman who bowled right-arm fast. He was born at West Bridgford, Nottinghamshire.

Walker made two first-class appearances for Nottinghamshire in the 1937 County Championship against Yorkshire at Headingley, and Lancashire at Trent Bridge. Despite bowling a total of 48 overs in his two matches, Walker took just a solitary wicket, that of Lancashire's Eddie Phillipson. With the bat he scored a total of 24 runs with a high score of 10 not out. 

At the end of the 1937 season Walker retired from professional cricket and joined the Nottingham City Police.

He died at Bridlington, Yorkshire, on 31 August 1995.

References

External links
George Walker at ESPNcricinfo
George Walker at CricketArchive

1919 births
1995 deaths
People from West Bridgford
Cricketers from Nottinghamshire
English cricketers
Nottinghamshire cricketers